Lebia trimaculata is a species of ground beetles in the Harpalinae subfamily that can be found in Austria, Bulgaria, Croatia, Cyprus, France, Greece, Hungary, Italy (including Corsica and Sicily), Moldova, North Macedonia, Portugal, Romania, Russia, Slovakia, Switzerland, and Ukraine.

References

Lebia
Beetles described in 1789
Beetles of Europe